Nasser Nabeel Saleem (born February 11, 1990) is a Qatari footballer who is a defender . He is a first-generation graduate of the ASPIRE Academy.

Goals for senior national team

References

External links
 Goalzz.com Player Profile
 Al Sadd Official Site Player Profile

1990 births
Living people
Al Sadd SC players
Al-Arabi SC (Qatar) players
Mesaimeer SC players
Footballers at the 2010 Asian Games
Qatari footballers
Aspire Academy (Qatar) players
Qatar Stars League players
Association football defenders
Asian Games competitors for Qatar